Direct action (DA) is a term used in the context of military special operations for small-scale raids, ambushes, sabotage or similar actions.

The US Department of Defense has defined direct action as "Short-duration strikes and other small-scale offensive actions conducted as a special operation in hostile, denied, or politically sensitive environments and which employ specialized military capabilities to seize, destroy, capture, exploit, recover, or damage designated targets. Direct action differs from conventional offensive actions in the level of physical and political risk, operational techniques, and the degree of discriminate and precise use of force to achieve specific objectives."

The US military and many of its allies consider DA one of the basic special operations missions. Some units specialize in it, such as the Navy SEALs and 75th Ranger Regiment, and other units, such as US Army Special Forces, have DA capabilities but focus more on other operations. Unconventional warfare, special reconnaissance and direct action roles have merged throughout the decades and are typically performed primarily by the same units. For instance, while US Army Special Forces were originally created for unconventional warfare (UW) missions and gradually added other capabilities, the US Navy SEALs, and the UK Special Air Service (SAS) and Special Boat Service (SBS) continue to perform a primary DA role with special reconnaissance (SR) as original missions. The SEALs, SAS, and SBS added additional capabilities over time, responding to the needs of modern conflict. Russia's Spetsnaz combines DA and SR units.

Under the US Central Intelligence Agency's National Clandestine Service, there is a Special Activities Division to operate without apparent national identification for plausible deniability. The Joint Special Operations Command and the frequently-renamed Intelligence Support Activity are similar units.

References

Operations involving special forces